Jacob Patrick Short (born May 30, 1997 in Indianapolis, Indiana), known professionally as Jake Short, is an American actor. He is best known for his roles as Fletcher Quimby in the Disney Channel comedy series A.N.T. Farm (2011–2014), Oliver in the Disney XD series Mighty Med (2013–2015) and Lab Rats: Elite Force (2016). Short currently plays Mattie Sullivan in the British sitcom The First Team (2020). Short is of English, German, Scottish, and Irish descent.

Career 
His first major role was Fletcher Quimby in Disney Channel's comedy series A.N.T. Farm. He also starred as Nose Noseworthy in the 2009 film Shorts, and has acted in numerous commercials.

In 2013, Short began co-starring as Oliver on the Disney XD original series Mighty Med and its spinoff Lab Rats: Elite Force.

Since 2020, Short has starred as Mattie Sullivan in the British soccer-based sitcom The First Team.

On November 16, 2022, Short started a podcast called Hit the Brake with Bradley Steven Perry.

Filmography

Film

Television

Music videos

Awards and nominations

References

External links

1997 births
21st-century American male actors
American male child actors
American male film actors
American male television actors
Living people
Male actors from Indianapolis